Knife Fight is an American reality/cooking competition television series on Esquire Network. It was set to premiere April 23, 2013, but was pushed to September 24, 2013, to coincide with rebranding of the now-defunct Esquire. Knife Fight was hosted by season 2 Top Chef winner Ilan Hall and executive produced by Drew Barrymore. The show ran for four seasons.

Synopsis
Originally set in Hall's restaurant The Gorbals in downtown Los Angeles, this secret underground happening took place during the overnight hours when restaurants close their doors to the public. This kind of competition has not been (nor meant to be) televised. In the show's premise, two talented cooks were selected to prove who's the best. They're cheered and heckled by a rowdy crowd of celebrities, restaurant critics, die-hard foodies, and sometimes each other. The chefs are given 1-3 mandatory ingredients, such as pig heads, jackfruit, and live catfish. They're given one hour to prepare at least two dishes, but may prepare more. The chefs may plate and present dishes at any time during the hour. The winner of each episode earns "bragging rights" as well as a cleaver with "I Won" written on it.  The loser receives a smaller cleaver with "I Almost Won" written on it. In rare cases where picking the winner is too close to call, the 2 chefs go through a "Sudden Death" round where they make a dish in 5 minutes.

Former Top Chef contestant CJ Jacobson revealed on his podcast that the show was originally going to be named Food Fight Club after the David Fincher film Fight Club.

Series overview 
{| class="wikitable plainrowheaders" style="text-align: center;"
|-
! style="padding: 0px 8px;" colspan="2" rowspan="2"| Season
! style="padding: 0px 8px;" rowspan="2"| Episodes
! colspan="3" style="padding: 0px 8px;"| Originally aired
|-
! scope="col" style="padding: 0px 8px;"| Season premiere
! scope="col" style="padding: 0px 8px;"| Season finale
|-
 |style="background-color: #40e0d0;"|
 |1
 |18
 |
 |
|-
 |style="background-color: #df73ff;"|
 |2
 |23
 |
 |
|-
 |
 |3
 |13
 |
 |
|-
 |
 |4
 |15
 |
 |
|}

Episodes

Season 1

Season 2

Season 3

Season 4

References

External links

 

2013 American television series debuts
2015 American television series endings
2010s American reality television series
2010s American cooking television series
English-language television shows
Television series by Authentic Entertainment
Television series by Universal Television